Nuh district (formerly known as Mewat district) is one of the 22 districts in the Indian state of Haryana. There are four sub-divisions in this district: Nuh, Ferozepur Jhirka, Punahana, and Taoru. It is bounded by Gurugram District to the north, Palwal District of Haryana to the east and Alwar District of Rajasthan to the south and west. Its boundaries also touch Bharatpur District of Rajasthan and Mathura District of Uttar Pradesh near Bichhor Village and Nai Village of Punhana Tehsil. It is predominantly populated by farmers of Meo ethnicity.

In 2018, the Government of India's premier policy think tank Niti Aayog named erstwhile Mewat district as the most underdeveloped of India's 739 districts. Despite bordering Gurgaon District, Haryana's rich industrial and financial heartland, this district had the worst health and nutrition, education, agriculture and water resources, financial inclusion and skill development and basic infrastructure.

History
The district was created on 4 April 2005, by taking areas from Gurgaon district and the Hathin Block of Faridabad district. However, in 2008, Hathin sub-division was reorganized in the new district of Palwal. Mewat district was renamed Nuh in 2016, because Mewat is a cultural region which spans the state of Haryana, Rajasthan and Uttar Pradesh.

The district comprises Nuh, Taoru, Nagina, Ferozepur Jhirka, Indri, Punhana and Pinangwan blocks, 431 villages and 297 panchayats. There had been 512 villages and 365 panchayats in district before Hathin Block was transferred to Palwal district.

The Meo Muslims who inhabited this region were syncretic in past rituals.

In the 1920s the grassroots Islamic movement Tablighi Jamaat arose from this region under Muhammad Ilyas as a reformist movement. This Muslim region was heavily inflicted by partition violence of 1947, which in turn naturally altered the syncretic life style of people in the region.

Geography
The soil of the district is light in texture, composed of sandy soil, sandy loam and clay loam. The upper hills are mostly barren.

Sub-Divisions
The Nuh district is headed by an IAS officer of the rank of Deputy Commissioner DC (Ajay Kumar) who is the chief executive officer of the district. The district is divided into 4 sub-divisions, each headed by a Sub-Divisional Magistrate (SDM): Nuh, Ferozepur Jhirka, Punahana and Taoru.

Assembly constituencies
There are 3 Haryana Vidhan Sabha constituencies located in this district: Nuh, Ferozepur Jhirka and Punahana. All 3 are part of the Gurgaon Lok Sabha constituency. Taoru Sub-division of Nuh district comes under Sohna (Vidhan Sabha constituency) of Gurugram district.

Towns and villages
 
 
 Ferozepur Jhirka
 Khanpur Ghati
 Nagina (Nuh) – An important town of Ferozepur Jhirka Tehsil, located at the centre of the district. It is the sub-tehsil and block of the district. One I.T.I. is also located here.
 Nuh - It has a medical college established in August 2012 by government of haryana named SHKM GMC Nalhar.
 Pinangwan
 Punahana
 Tauru - An important town is a sub division of Mewat district this town's border touches with Gurgaon district and Bhiwadi district. Alwar (Rajasthan) is the only town in Mewat with a Hindu majority. One ITI and one college affiliated to MDU University

Demographics

According to the 2011 census, Nuh district had a population of 1,089,263. By population, it ranks 420th among the 640 districts of India. Its population growth rate over the decade 2001–2011 was 37.94%. It had a sex ratio of 906 females for every 1000 males, and a literacy rate of 56.1%. Scheduled Castes make up 6.91% of the population.

It's the only Muslim majority district in Haryana.

At the time of the 2011 Census of India, 36.17% of the population in the district spoke Hindi, 34.75% Mewati, 25.76% Urdu and 2.84% Haryanvi as their first language.

Economy

The main occupation in the district is agriculture, followed by allied and agro-based activities. The Meos are the predominant population group and are all agriculturists. Agriculture is mostly rain-fed except in small pockets where canal irrigation is available, and crop yield per hectare is low compared with the rest of the state. Animal husbandry, particularly dairy, is the secondary source of income for the people; those who live closer to the hilly ranges of Aravali also keep sheep and goats. The heavy indebtedness of most of the farmers requires them to sell milk to their lenders at below-market price, which drastically reduces their income.

Towns such as Punhana, Pinangwan, Ferozepur Jhirka, Taoru and Nuh are major hubs of retail shopping and act as backbones of day-to-day life in the area. The district also has a MMTC–PAMP factory located in the Rojka–Meo industrial estate.

Climate

The district falls under the sub-tropical semi-arid climatic zone with extremely hot temperatures in summer.

About 80% of the annual rainfall is received during the monsoon season, from June to September with a peak in July. Dryness of air is a standard feature in Mewat district, with high humidity only during the monsoon period. During the monsoon, the sky is heavily clouded, and winds are strong. Winds are generally light during the post-monsoon and winter months. The dry season of minimum humidity (less than 20%) is between April and May, when strong dusty winds are conspicuous.

Nuh district experiences a high incidence of thunderstorms and dust storms, often accompanied by violent squalls (Bengali: andhar ) from April to June. The thunderstorms may be accompanied by heavy rain and occasionally by hail. In the winter months, fog may appear in the district.

Transport
Nuh town is on National Highway 248A (NH 248A) (previously known as the Gurgaon–Sohna–Alwar road), connecting the district to Gurugram and Alwar. The Kundli–Manesar–Palwal (KMP) Expressway provides high-speed access to the district from Palwal and Manesar. Major District Roads 131 and 135 connect to the Delhi–Agra Highway.

The planned route of the Delhi–Mumbai Expressway will pass west of Pinangwan town and is expected to boost connectivity to cities.

See also 

 Mewat State
 Hodal

References

External links
 Official website of district Nuh

 
Districts of Haryana
Minority Concentrated Districts in India
2005 establishments in Haryana
Mewat